Chlorochlamys appellaria is a species of emerald moth in the family Geometridae. It is found in Central America and North America.

The MONA or Hodges number for Chlorochlamys appellaria is 7073.

References

Further reading

 
 

Hemitheini